Surinamese culture has strong Asian, African and European influences. The population is mainly composed of the contribution of people from the Netherlands, India, Africa, China and Indonesia, as well as indigenous peoples who lived in the area, before the arrival of European settlers.

Cultural events
 New Year's Eve
 Holi-Phagwa
 Easter
 Labour Day
 Prawas Din
 Keti Koti
 Javanese Arrival Day
 Indigenous People's Day
 Day of the Maroons
 Chinese Arrival Day
 Independence Day
 Christmas

Music

Suriname is a South American country, a former colony of the Netherlands. The country is known for its kaseko music, and for having an Indo-Caribbean tradition.

The term kaseko is probably derived from the French expression casser le corps ('break the body'), which was used during slavery to indicate a very swift dance. Kaseko is a fusion of numerous popular and folk styles derived from Africa, Europe and the Americas. It is rhythmically complex, with percussion instruments including skratji (a very large bass drum) and snare drums, as well as saxophone, trumpet and occasionally trombone. Singing can be both solo and choir. Songs are typically call-and-response, as are Creole folk styles from the area, such as kawina.

Kaseko emerged from the traditional Afro-Surinamese kawina music, which was played since the beginning of 1900 by street musicians in Paramaribo. It evolved in the 1930s during festivities that used large bands, especially brass bands, and was called Bigi Poku (big drum music). In the late 1940s, jazz, calypso and other importations became popular, while rock and roll soon left its own influence in the form of electrified instruments.

The biennial music festival SuriPop is the country's largest music event.

Cuisine

Surinamese cuisine is extensive, since the population of Suriname came from many countries. Surinamese cuisine is a combination of many international cuisines including Indian, African, Indonesian (Javanese), Chinese, Dutch, Jewish, Portuguese, and Amerindian cuisines. Basic foods include rice, plants such as tayer and cassava, and roti. Usually, there is chicken on the menu in many variations of the Chinese , the Indian chicken masala and pom, a very popular party dish of Creole origin. Also, salted meat and stockfish (bakkeljauw) are widely used. Yardlong beans, okra, and eggplant are examples of vegetables in the Surinamese kitchen. For a spicy taste, Madame Jeanette peppers are used.

Besides the casserole pom, roti (often served with a filling of chicken masala, potato and vegetables) is also often served on festive occasions with many guests. Other well known dishes are moksi-alesi (mixed boiled rice with salted meat, shrimp or fish, and any vegetable), rice and beans, peanut soup, battered fried plantain, bara and the original Javanese nasi goreng and mie goreng.

Desserts include boyo, a sweet cake made with coconut and cassava, and fiadu, a cake containing raisins, currants, almonds, and succade. Maizena koek are cornstarch cookies made with vanilla.

See also
 Surinamese literature

References

 Bakker, Eveline, et al., eds. Geschiedenis van Suriname: Van stam tot staat, 2nd ed., 1998. 
 Binnendijk, Chandra van, and Paul Faber, eds. Sranan: Cultuur in Suriname, 1992. 
 Bruijning, C. F. A., and J. Voorhoeve, eds. Encyclopedie van Suriname, 1978. 
 Buddingh', Hans. Geschiedenis van Suriname, 2nd ed., 1995. 
 Colchester, Marcus. Forest Politics in Suriname, 1995. 
 Dew, Edward M. The Difficult Flowering of Surinam: Ethnicity and Politics in a Plural Society, 1978. 
 Economist Intelligence Unit. Country Profile Suriname 1998–99, 1999. 
 Hoefte, Rosemarijn. Suriname, 1990. 
 Lier, R. A. J. van. Frontier Society: A Social Analysis of the History of Surinam, 1971. 
 Meel, Peter. "Towards a Typology of Suriname Nationalism." New West Indian Guide 72 (3/4): 257–281, 1998. 
 Oostindie, Gert. Het paradijs overzee: De 'Nederlandse' Caraiben en Nederland, 1997. 
 Plotkin, Mark. J. Tales of a Shaman's Apprentice: An Ethnobotanist Searches for New Medicines in the Amazon Rain Forest, 1993. 
 Price, Richard. First-Time: The Historical Vision of an Afro-American People, 1983. 
 Sedoc-Dahlberg, Betty, ed. The Dutch Caribbean: Prospects for Democracy, 1990. 
 Szulc-Krzyzanowski, Michel, and Michiel van Kempen. Deep-Rooted Words: Ten Storytellers and Writers from Surinam (South America), 1992.

External links